The Red Tusk is a mountain in the Tantalus Range of the Pacific Ranges in southwestern British Columbia, Canada, located  southeast of Mount Tantalus and  west of Cheekye. 

The Red Tusk gets its name from the reddish metamorphic rock that forms the mountain. It has a similar appearance to the smaller, but more famous Black Tusk in the Garibaldi Ranges further east.

References
 The Red Tusk in the Canadian Mountain Encyclopedia.
 

Two-thousanders of British Columbia
Pacific Ranges
New Westminster Land District